Dactyloscopus zelotes is a species of sand stargazer native to the Pacific coast of Central and South America from El Salvador to Ecuador.  It can reach a maximum length of  SL.

References

External links
 Photograph

zelotes
Taxa named by David Starr Jordan
Taxa named by Charles Henry Gilbert
Fish described in 1896